The Northern Nigerian Publishing Company Limited is one of the oldest publishing company in Northern Nigeria base in Zaria.

History 
The company is the second publishing company in Northern Nigeria after Northern Provinces Newsheet established in Kano that are publishing books in Ajami and Hausa.

Publication 
Most of its publication focused on Nigerian Books, especially Books that are related to Hausa language, the Company has published books for well-known Hausa authors of Northern Nigeria, including Magana Jari Ce, Ruwan Bagaja by Abubakar Imam, Ganɗoki by Muhammadu Bello Kagara, other Books include Shaihu Umar, Jiki Magayi . The company is the first Nigerian Publishing Company to produce a Hausa Book in the year 1934 called Ruwan Bagaja by Bello Kagara. and the most populous Hausa story book Magana Jari ce.

See also 
 University Press plc
 Abubakar Imam
 Muhammadu Bello Kagara
 Magana Jari Ce
 Ruwan Bagaja

Bibliography 
 Furniss, Graham (1996). Poetry, prose and popular culture in Hausa. International African Institute. Edinburgh: Edinburgh University Press for the International African Institute.

External link 
 https://northern-nigerian-publishing-company-ltd.business.site/

Reference 

Book publishing companies of Nigeria
Companies based in Kaduna State